Bavaki-ye Amir Bakhtiar (also Romanized as Bāvakī-ye Amīr Bakhtīār  and Bāvekī-ye Amīr Bakhtīār; also known as Bāvekī, Bāvokī, Bābki, Bārkī, and Bauki) is a village in Silakhor-e Sharqi Rural District, in the Central District of Azna County, Lorestan Province, Iran. At the 2006 census, its population was 350, in 79 families.

References 

Towns and villages in Azna County